Neath North is an electoral ward of Neath Port Talbot county borough, Wales falling within the community of Neath.

Neath North includes some or all of the neighbourhoods of Llantwit and Neath town centre in the parliamentary constituency of Neath.  It is bounded by the wards of Bryncoch South to the northwest; Cadoxton to the North; Tonna to the northeast; Cimla to the southeast; Neath South to the south; and Neath East to the southwest.

Election results

Neath Port Talbot
In the 2017 local council elections, the results were:

In the 2012 local council elections, the electorate turnout was 34.69%.  The results were:

Cllr Lockyer initially won his seat at a by-election on 6 May 2010, on a 63% turnout. This had followed the resignation of previous Labour councillor, Derek Vaughan, who had been elected as a Member of the European Parliament for Wales in 2009. He had been councillor for Neath North since 1995.

West Glamorgan
Between 1989 and 1996 Neath North was a ward to West Glamorgan County Council. The Labour councillor, Frank Evans, had previously been a representative for the Neath No.1 ward and was elected unopposed to Neath North in 1989. He was re-elected in 1993. He was elected to Neath Port Talbot Council in 1995.

Glamorgan
Until 1974 Neath North was a ward to Glamorgan County Council.

References

Electoral wards of Neath Port Talbot
Glamorgan electoral wards
Neath
Electoral wards of West Glamorgan